Calandro is an opera buffa in three acts composed by Giovanni Alberto Ristori to a libretto by Stefano Benedetto Pallavicino. The libretto was based on the comedy Il Calandro by Bernardo Dovizi (Cardinal Bibbiena). In turn, Dovizi's play borrowed elements of the plot from Plautus's Menaechmi and the character Calandro from Boccaccio's Decameron It was first staged on 2 September 1726 in Dresden.

Background and performance history
Calandro premiered on 2 September 1726 in the court theatre at the Schloss Pillnitz (Pillnitz Castle) near Dresden at the request of Maria Josepha of Austria to celebrate the return of her husband, Crown Prince Frederick Augustus, from Warsaw. It was probably Germany's first opera buffa, and after hearing a performance during the 1728 Carnival season in Dresden, Frederick Augustus' father August II asked for a copy of the score. Three years later, in 1731, it became the first Italian opera presented in Russia. There it was given in Moscow for the celebration of the coronation of Empress Anna. It was produced under his and his father's direction with thirteen actors and nine singers including Ludovica Seyfried, Margherita Ermini and Rosalia Fantasia.

Like most of Ristori's operas Calandro eventually fell into oblivion. However, it was revived in a recording by the Batzdorfer Hofkapelle in 2004, and will have a fully staged performance in June 2011 as part of the Potsdam Sanssouci Music Festival.

Synopsis
Calandro, disillusioned with mankind and wanting to return to nature, spends his days in a forest with his tame bears. There, Alceste, leader of the shepherds, engages him as the tutor for his son, Nearco. Through a series of twists and turns, the unruly Nearco contrives to get rid of his tutor and in the process sort out the problems of his friend Licisco who is in love with Clizia.

Recordings
Giovanni Alberto Ristori: Calandro, commedia per musica. Batzdorfer Hofkapelle; Tobias Schade and Stefan Rath (conductors). Label: KammerTon (KT 22005) Audio CD, 2004.
Egbert Junghanns (Calandro) – baritone; Jan Kobow (Alceste) – tenor;  (Nearco) – countertenor; Maria Jonas (Agide) – mezzo-soprano; Britta Schwarz (Clizia) – contralto

Operas set to the same story
Antonio Sacchini, L'avaro deluso, o Don Calandrino, premiered November 24, 1778 London
Johann Georg Schürer, Calandro, premiered January 20, 1748, Dresden
Giuseppe Gazzaniga, Il Calandrino (Il Calandrano), premiered 1771, Venice

References

Sources
Buelow, George J. (2004). A History of Baroque Music. Indiana University Press. 

Mengelberg, Rudolf (1916). Giovanni Alberto Ristori. Universitat Leipzig 
Potsdam Sanssouci Music Festival (2011). Programme 
Sadie, Julie Anne (1998). "Ristori, Giovanni Alberto". Companion to Baroque Music. University of California Press, pp. 200–201. 
Zórawska-Witkowska, Alina (2007). "Giovanni Alberto Ristori and his Serenate at the Polish Court of Augustus III, 1735–1746" in Music as Social and Cultural Practice: Essays in honour of Reinhard Strohm (Melania Bucciarelli and Berta Joncus eds). Boydell & Brewer, pp. 139–158.

External links

Operas by Giovanni Alberto Ristori
Italian-language operas
Operas
1726 operas
Works based on Menaechmi
Operas based on plays
Operas based on works by Giovanni Boccaccio